Emeka Ononye is a Canadian soccer player who last played for Toronto FC II in the USL.

Club career

College and Amateur
Ononye played at Wright State University for four years. He made 76 appearances, scoring 7 goals. In his junior year Ononye received Second Team All-Horizon League honors and in his senior year he earned First Team All-Horizon League and was selected to NSCAA Third Team All-Great Lakes Region.

In 2014, he played with PDL side K-W United FC and made 14 appearances.

Professional
After trialling with USL side Toronto FC II, he was signed to a contract on April 29, 2015. He made his debut on May 14 against St. Louis FC. Ononye was let go at the end of the 2015 season as his contract was not renewed .

References

External links
PDL profile
Wright State University profile

Living people
Canadian soccer players
Canadian expatriate soccer players
Wright State Raiders men's soccer players
K-W United FC players
Toronto FC II players
Association football defenders
Soccer people from Ontario
Sportspeople from Richmond Hill, Ontario
Expatriate soccer players in the United States
USL League Two players
USL Championship players
Year of birth missing (living people)
ANB Futbol players
Canadian expatriate sportspeople in the United States